Mauno Nissinen (born 16 August 1947) is a Finnish gymnast. He competed at the 1968 Summer Olympics and the 1972 Summer Olympics.

References

External links
 

1947 births
Living people
Finnish male artistic gymnasts
Olympic gymnasts of Finland
Gymnasts at the 1968 Summer Olympics
Gymnasts at the 1972 Summer Olympics
Sportspeople from Oulu
20th-century Finnish people